Eef van Dongen (born 1993) is a Dutch orienteering competitor. She received a bronze medal at the first ever knock-out sprint event at the 2022 World Orienteering Championships, behind Tove Alexandersson and Megan Carter Davies. van Dongen competes for both Vasterviks OK and OLifant orienteering clubs.

van Dongen is the first Dutch orienteer to receive a medal in the World Championships; the Netherlands has low participation in Orienteering, with only 450 registered members as of 2022. In an interview in the lead up to the 2022 World Games, van Dongen indicated that she only started Orienteering in 2018 after meeting her partner, Simon Jakobsson. She attended a training camp in Zurich in spring 2018, and decided to focus on sprint orienteering. van Dongen attended her first World Orienteering Championships in 2021; she had run less than 10 sprint races by the time she competed at the 2021 World Orienteering Championships.

van Dongen participated in Volleyball and Judo as a child, and more recently has been involved in endurance running and skating. She works as a researcher in glaciology at the University of Stockholm, and as a modeler at the Swedish Meteorological and Hydrological Institute.

References

External links
 

1993 births
Living people
Female orienteers
Foot orienteers
World Orienteering Championships medalists
20th-century Dutch women
21st-century Dutch women